Downsville is an unincorporated community and census-designated place (CDP) in southwestern Washington County, Maryland, United States. Its population was 355 as of the 2010 census. It is located southeast of Williamsport on Maryland Route 63 and on Maryland Route 632, southwest of Hagerstown. It is officially included in the Hagerstown Metropolitan Area (Hagerstown-Martinsburg, MD-WV Metropolitan Statistical Area).

Geography

Demographics

References

Unincorporated communities in Washington County, Maryland
Unincorporated communities in Maryland
Census-designated places in Washington County, Maryland
Census-designated places in Maryland